HMS Contest was a  destroyer of the Royal Navy, built by J. Samuel White, Cowes. Laid down on 1 November 1943 and commissioned on 9 November 1945, she was the Royal Navy's first all-welded warship. She was scrapped in 1960.

Operational service
On commissioning Contest served as part of the 8th Destroyer Squadron in the Far East.

In 1947, Contest was ordered to the Solomon Islands as a deterrence against feared violence when the leaders of the Maasina Ruru independence movement were arrested. While on passage back to the UK from the Far East in December 1947, Contest and sister ship  were diverted to Aden in response to anti-Jewish rioting, with men from the two destroyers and the survey ship  being landed to try to restore order. She returned to the UK for a refit in 1948. She was given an interim modernization and was fitted for minelaying. In 1951 she was the Torpedo training ship at Portsmouth. She then served as part of the 6th Destroyer Squadron in the Home Fleet. In 1953 she took part in the Coronation Review of the Fleet to celebrate the Coronation of Queen Elizabeth II.

Decommissioning and disposal
Contest was paid off in the late 1950s. Following her sale she arrived at the breakers yard for scrapping at Thos. W. Ward Grays, Essex on 2 February 1960.

References

Publications
 
 
 
 
 

 

Cold War destroyers of the United Kingdom
1944 ships
C-class destroyers (1943) of the Royal Navy